Data format in information technology may refer to:
 Data type, constraint placed upon the interpretation of data in a type system
 Signal (electrical engineering), a format for signal data used in signal processing
 Recording format, a format for encoding data for storage on a storage medium
 File format, a format for encoding data for storage in a computer file
 Container format (digital), a format for encoding data for storage by means of a standardized audio/video codecs file format
 Content format, a format for representing media content as data
 Audio format, a format for encoded sound data
 Video format, a format for encoded video data